The Morningside Ward is a Brisbane City Council ward covering Morningside, Balmoral, Bulimba, Hawthorne, Norman Park, Seven Hills, and parts of Camp Hill and Cannon Hill.

Councillors for Morningside Ward

Results

References 

City of Brisbane wards